Auxa divaricata is a species of beetle in the family Cerambycidae. It was described by Charles Coquerel in 1851.

References

Auxa
Beetles described in 1851
Taxa named by Charles Coquerel